Eli Ahmed is an Indian writer, scriptwriter, director, lyricist, costume designer, actress and social activist. She is also the editor, publisher and proprietor of ‘Orani’, the women's magazine. It is the only women's magazine in the Northeast since 1970. She had also organised the first women's drama group in Assam in 1967. She was awarded the Padma Shri by the Government of India in 2017 for her contribution to literature and education.

Early life
Eli Ahmed was born in an aristocratic family in Nazira. Her father Abdur Rashid, was a surgeon. She lost her mother at a young age. She traces her roots to one of the five Parsi families referred to in Medini Mohan Choudhury's book Luit, Barak and Islam.
Eli is known by different names to many. Nalinibala Devi called her Pokhila (butterfly), Nirmal Prabha Bordoloi calls her Beli (sun), filmmaker Brajen Barua called her Geet (song) and Bhupen Hazarika calls her Rong (colour). And friends call her Jui or fire.

Career
From an early age she used to recite self-composed poems and children's rhymes. In 1967, she had formed a children's cultural group named Rong Chora and performed cultural programmes in different parts of Assam. Her first musical feature Bhagyor Chokori Ghure , was performed in the Nazira session of the Asam Sahitya Sabha in 1962.

She came to Guwahati to appear for an interview at the Balak Sewika Prashikshan Kendra under the department of social welfare in 1965.

She made her mark as a lyricist with Dwipen Barua's famous song Ga Ga Aji Gai Jaa Ei Geetoke Ga in Brajen Barua's famous film Dr. Bezbaruah. She has written lyrics for popular films like: 
Baruar Sansar, 
Sadari, 
Sonmaina, 
Pratidin, 
Devata. 
She also wrote lyrics for the television serials Gadhuli, Sahual and Apabad.

She has been the scriptwriter for several Assamese films like 
Dhrubatora, 
Bordoichila, 
Bonphool, 
Janambhumi . 
She has scripted five documentary films —
Old Monuments of Ahom Age, 
Child Psychology,
Mahasheeta, 
Syed Abdul Malik 
The Milk.

She was the storywriter of films like
Baruar Sansar,
Jakhini, 
Bonphool, 
Mukahgni, 
Janambhumi
Rickshawala

She was the scriptwriter, art director and costume designer for many of these films.
She has to her credit several successful dramas — 
Bhahkhari, 
Kothatunu Ki, 
Sakina Jethair Moni,
Kakadeutar Sadhu,
Natusola, 
Ami Abhinay Kara Nai.

Some of her books are
Ankur, a short story collection, 
Moniram Dewan, published by Assam Sahitya Sabha,
Rongmonor Mon, 
Moi Ketia Aita Hom, published by Asom Prakashan Parishad, 
Asom Birangana published by the Department of Information and Broadcasting, government of India

Award and recognition
She is a life member of the Assam Sahitya Sabha and winner of the national literary prize on adult education for her book
Bonphool in 1976. She also got Dr. Nirmal Prabha Bordoloi Award in 2011 and Amalprava Das Award in 2013 for her contributions to the field of literature.

She was awarded the Padma Shri by the Government of India in 2017 for her contribution to literature and education.

References 

Recipients of the Padma Shri in literature & education
Recipients of the Sahitya Akademi Bal Sahitya Puraskar Puraskar
Women writers from Assam
Living people
1934 births